Metridium Fields is the major label debut by San Francisco-based doom metal outfit Giant Squid. It is a re-recorded version of their album Metridium Field, which was released independently by the band two years earlier.

The band's original debut album, Metridium Field was self-released in 2004, and after signing with The End Records in 2005, the band decided to remaster the album for its world-wide release. Upon finding the original master tracks had become unusable, Giant Squid re-recorded the entire album and re-released it as their major label debut and first "official" album. Fields was released on August 22, 2006, and brought the band critical acclaim and a devoted fanbase.

The title of the album and its closing track is named for Metridium, a genus of sea anemone.

Artwork
The painting depicted in the album cover is Watson and the Shark by John Singleton Copley.

Track listing

Metridium Field

Metridium Fields

Personnel
 Aurielle Gregory – vocals, guitar, banjo, Juno 106, Prophet 600, Moog Opus
 Aaron Gregory – vocals, guitar, banjo, theremin
 Bryan Beeson – bass
 Michael Conroy – drums
 Tim Conroy – trumpet

2006 debut albums
Giant Squid (band) albums
The End Records albums